Encelia scaposa, common name onehead brittlebush  is a North American species of flowering plants in the family Asteraceae. It has been found in western Texas, southwestern New Mexico, and Chihuahua.

Encelia scaposa is a shrub up to 60 cm (2 feet) tall. Leaves are oblanceolate to linear, rarely more than 10 cm (4 inches) long. One plant can produce several flower heads. The heads are unusual in the genus in having as many as 40 ray florets in addition to the disc florets.

References

scaposa
Flora of Chihuahua (state)
Flora of New Mexico
Flora of Texas
Flora of the Chihuahuan Desert
Plants described in 1891
Taxa named by Asa Gray